Fishhook Lake is a lake in Hubbard County, in the U.S. state of Minnesota.

Fishhook Lake is the English translation of the native Ojibwe language name.

See also
List of lakes in Minnesota

References

Lakes of Minnesota
Lakes of Hubbard County, Minnesota